Nikolayevka is a rural locality (a selo) in Alataninsky Selsoviet, Sterlitamaksky District, Bashkortostan, Russia. The population was 66 as of 2010.

Geography 
It is located 29 km from Sterlitamak, 4 km from Alatana.

References 

Rural localities in Sterlitamaksky District